The Rosedale Arch is dedicated to the men of Rosedale, a neighborhood district and former municipality on the southern edge of Kansas City, Kansas, who served in World War I. Inspired by the Arc de Triomphe, the Arch was designed by John LeRoy Marshall, a Rosedale resident, and dedicated in 1924.  Located on Mount Marty, the flood-lighted arch is most easily visible at night from the intersection of Rainbow Boulevard and Southwest Boulevard. A historic marker was dedicated under the arch in 1993 to honor the soldiers of World War II, Korean War, and Vietnam War.

History
A groundbreaking ceremony held on July 20, 1923, featuring French General Henri Gouraud, was more impressive than the opening ceremony after the arch was completed.

References

External links

 Kansas City local area information
 Rosedale Development Association
 The Winding Valley and The Craggy Hillside : A History of the City of Rosedale, Kansas by Margaret Landis. Chapter XII THE ROSEDALE MEMORIAL ARCH (and Athletic Field)

Military monuments and memorials in the United States
Buildings and structures in Kansas City, Kansas
World War I memorials in the United States
Monuments and memorials in Kansas
Monuments and memorials on the National Register of Historic Places in Kansas
Tourist attractions in Wyandotte County, Kansas
1923 sculptures
National Register of Historic Places in Kansas City, Kansas
Triumphal arches in the United States